The khawal was a traditional native Egyptian male dancer cross-dressed in feminine attire and was popular up until the late eighteenth and early nineteenth centuries.

History
Following prohibitions on women dancing in some public places, cross-dressing boys and men took their place to continue the local tradition publicly, these dancers were known as khawal, an Egyptian slang for queer, and were mainly dressed in feminine clothes and outfits. The khawal imitated female ghawazi by dancing with castanet self accompaniment, painting their hands with henna, braiding their long hair, plucking their facial hair, wearing make-up, and adopting the manners of women.

As they impersonate women, their dances are exactly of the same description as those of the Ghawazee [female dancers] ... Their general appearance ... is more feminine than masculine: they suffer the hair of the head to grow long, and generally braid it, in the manner of women ... they imitate the women also in applying kohl and henna to their eyes and hands like women. In the streets, when not engaged in dancing, they often veil their faces; not from shame, but merely to affect the manners of women.

Khawal distinguished themselves from women by wearing a mix of men's and women's clothing. The khawal performed at various functions such as weddings, births, circumcisions, and festivals. 

In the eighteenth and nineteenth century, they also commonly performed for foreign visitors, variously shocking or delighting them. The khawal were perceived as sexually available; their male audiences found their ambiguity seductive.

In modern Egyptian slang, the term is derogatory and refers to a passive gay man, and is considered offensive.

See also
 Köçek
 Bacha bazi

References

Egyptian culture

Transgender in the Middle East
Middle Eastern culture
Arab culture
Belly dance
Male erotic dancers
Cross-dressing
LGBT in Egypt
18th century in LGBT history
19th century in LGBT history
Gender systems
Third gender